Alabat, officially the Municipality of Alabat,  is a 5th class municipality in the province of Quezon, Philippines. According to the 2020 census, it has a population of 15,936 people.

The name Alabat came from the local Tagalog word Alabat, meaning "balustrade".

The town is home to a few speakers of the critically endangered Inagta Alabat language, one of the most endangered languages in the world as listed by UNESCO.

Etymology
Long before the colonial Spanish, Japanese, or Americans set foot on Alabat Island, the mountains were already inhabited by the “Baluga” (aborigines). Nomadic by nature, they would clean patches of land, plant rice and vegetables and hunt.  After harvest, they would migrate to another part of the forest and repeat the cycle.  The elder of the community was their leader and adviser.  During drought, they made temporary houses near the shore and used fishing as their primary means of livelihood.

Local folklore says that a Spanish priest from the mainland saw the Island from across the Lamon bay. He was curious as to what lay in that island and its inhabitants. The Spanish priest crossed the bay on the boat and founded a church at what is today barangay Gordon. The church today is underwater but the cross can still be seen.

The name Alabat which has been used as it is now, came from the word Alâbât (local Tagalog word for balustrade or balcony).  The early inhabitants of this place made balustrades across their doors to prevent small children from walking out of the house or falling from the stairwells.

Local history says that a platoon of American soldiers came to Lupac after the Philippine independence to conduct a survey.  They entered a native's hut and asked the person what the name of the place was.  The owner of the house at that time was holding the balustrade that he was making.  Unable to understand the English language, he thought they were asking what he was doing so the native replied alâbât!  The leader took his diary and wrote the word A L A B A T without any accent.

Another local folklore says that the name 'Alabat' was from Muslim origins where Alabat comes from Allah-bat, and if the word is mixed up actually means bat-ala or bathala which is the local word for god.

But according to the RA 956, Alabat was founded on Oct. 23, 1903. Meanwhile, the legal basis of creation is May 15, 1900

The separation of Silangan (now Quezon) as an independent municipality was declared in 1914.  This municipality was named in honor of President Manuel L Quezon.  In 1929, the inhabitants of Sangirin (now Perez) clamored also for separation from Alabat.  By the end of the same year, Sangirin was granted freedom and became an independent municipality named in honor of then Felimon Perez, who was the Governor of the Province.

Today, Alabat island is composed of 3 towns, Perez in the northern tip, Alabat town proper at the center and Quezon in the south.  The town of Alabat saw new development in the early 21st century: a modern port was built to replace the old one, more paved roads are being constructed, telephone service, cellphone sites, wireless internet and local government projects to improve the lives of Alabateños.

Alabat, Quezon has been featured several times in various television programs in the country such as Tapatan Ni Tunyin, Kapuso Mo, Jessica Soho, Motorcycle Diaries and more, because of its natural beauty. In an article published in Inquirer, written by Lester Villegas Alabat, Quezon was dubbed as the "Hidden Paradise of Quezon Province".

Geography
Located centrally on the eponymous Alabat Island, It is between the Pacific Ocean and Lamon Bay, with good fishing grounds, fertile soil, wide plains and near to a river and safe landing shore.

Barangays
Alabat is politically subdivided into 19 barangays, 5 of which are urban and 14 rural.

 Angeles
 Bacong
 Balungay
 Buenavista
 Caglate
 Camagong
 Gordon
 Pambilan Norte
 Pambilan Sur
 Barangay 1 (Poblacion)
 Barangay 2 (Poblacion)
 Barangay 3 (Poblacion)
 Barangay 4 (Poblacion)
 Barangay 5 (Poblacion)
 Villa Esperanza
 Villa Jesus Este
 Villa Jesus Weste
 Villa Norte
 Villa Victoria

Climate

Alabat experiences tropical rainforest climate (Af) as rainfall in all months exceeds . There is a significant difference between the driest and the wettest month whereas the driest month is April with rainfall total , while the wettest month is December with rainfall total . The rainfall seems increased significantly in October.

History
The first inhabitants of the town were the indigenous Inagta Alabat people who are Negritos, the earliest settlers in the Philippines. The indigenous people spoke the Inagta Alabat language, one of the most endangered languages in the world.

During the Spanish colonial period, Alabat was inhabited by the family of Caparros because of its safe landing shore and overflowing natural resources. Other immigrants from Gumaca came pouring in upon hearing the suitability of this place from human habitation. They named the place "CAMAGONG". Perhaps this name was taken from trees which bore edible fruits called Camagong or Mabulo which grow abundantly in Camagong Mountain, the highest mountain in Alabat Island.

It was said that Rev. Father Jesus, in charge of the parish of Gumaca possessed a telescope. Almost every time he looked through his telescope to see whether Moro Vintas were coming. He reached out a focus on the sandy shore of Ilangin, the present sitio of the barrio of Gordon. It came to his mind that an Ermita should be built in that place. So he summoned the leaders of the settlers to congregate and encouraged them to settle at Ilangin in order to make a vesita and build on Ermita.

The growth was so abrupt that a village sprang. Father Jesus called this village "GORDO" (meaning fat) and afterwards he named it Gordon in memory of his town in Spain.

Then came Don Pedro Pica and his brother Don Nicolas, who wanted to establish a home in Gorden. Upon reaching the place they found out that anchorage was difficult on account of the shallow coral reefs and absence of navigable river. Inquiries were made among the villagers and Don Pedro learned the suitability of Lupac, the present site of Alabat. He ordered Francisco Mercado, Modesto Arcaya, Casimero Caparros, Luciano Caparros, Cayetano Caparros, Pedro Caparros, Juan Caparros, Venancio Mascariña, Valentin Lisardo, Camilo Febrer, Antonio Montañez, Mariano Silva, Eusebio Baranta, Cayetano Olivares, Jose Canata and many others to clean a site in Lupac for a new village.

When Rev. Father Jesus heard about this act of Don Pedro Pica, he was neatly infuriated. He accused these two men and by the order of Capitang Totoy of Gumaca, they were taken to prison until Don Pedro Pica secured freedom from the gobernadorcillos of Tayabas. The Gobernadorcillo also pardoned his brother Don Nicolas Pica the following year. The interest of these two brothers in Lupac did not fade away so they returned to the place and established a lumber industry. The Gobernadorcillo learned of their success in their industry and their able leadership to settlers of the place so Don Pedro, the elder, gained influence from the Gobernadorcillo and was appointed sub-Captain of Lupac under Capitan Totoy of Gumaca. Through the order of Father Jesus, Don Pedro Pica changed the name Lupac to BARCELONA in memory of the beautiful coastal town in Spain.

When the American Expeditionary forces occupied Tayabas Province and appointed Carpenter as Military Governor, the name BARCELONA was changed to ALABAT.

Demographics

Alabat Island Agta Language
In 2010, UNESCO released its 3rd world volume of Endangered Languages in the World, where 3 critically endangered languages were in the Philippines. One of these languages in the Alabat Island Agta language which has an estimated speaker of 30 people in the year 2000. The language was classified as Critically Endangered, meaning the youngest speakers are grandparents and older, and they speak the language partially and infrequently and hardly pass the language to their children and grandchildren anymore. If the remaining 30 people do not pass their native language to the next generation of Alabat Agta people, their indigenous language will be extinct within a period of 1 to 2 decades.

The Alabat Agta people live only on the island of Alabat in Quezon province. They are one of the original Negrito settlers in the entire Philippines. They belong to the Aeta people classification, but have distinct language and belief systems unique to their own culture and heritage.

Economy 

Economic activities in Alabat are heavily concentrated in the poblacion and other sub-urban barangays. Improved road network provides access from all towns in the island of Alabat to this partially urbanized town. Well-paved radial routes criss-crossing in and out of the town facilitate the transport of unlimited assortment of merchandise, supplies, and raw materials to and from the town on a round-the-clock basis. The major crops of the town are rice, coconut and calamansi.

Port of Alabat
Alabat is considered one of the most important commercial and trading point in the island and in the whole Lamon Bay Area.  This town are nested among a wide expanse of coconut trees, rice-land and moderately rolling hills of gross and shrinks for pleasure. It has a rich fishing ground which supplies fish and other seafoods to neighboring towns.
Port of Alabat is considered one of the longest port in the province.

Agriculture
Total Number of Fishermen and farmers- 3000 (estimate)
Area of Irrigated Lands- 150 hectares (unofficial)

Culture

Events and festivals
Santo Niño Festival	- (3rd Sunday of January)
Coconut Festival	- May 15	 
Flores De Mayo	- (Last Sunday of May)	 
Feast of Our Lady of Mt. Carmel (Town Fiesta)	- July 16

Government

Elected officials
Municipal council (2019-2022):
Mayor: Fernando L. Mesa
Vice Mayor: Raul U. Declaro
Councilors:
Jorge Roito N. Hirang Jr.
Khem Wenbert M. Hervera
Hubert B. Ursolino
Ireneo R. Layosa Jr.
Lidio S. Española
Patricio L. Sasis Jr.
Dante M. Surreda
Florante B. Bantoc
Perlito L. Sasis - PPLB
Marriz M. Verzo- PPSK

Infrastructure

Transportation
Alabat is accessible by land where tricycles are administered by Alabat Tricycle Operators and Drivers Association (ALTODA) and jeepneys travelling in and out of the town; and water transportation via Atimonan-Alabat Route through the Alabat Feeder Port. Traveling around the town proper is no problem since there are hundreds of tricycles circling the Town Proper.

Communication
Alabat is served by a landline company like SANTELCOR, while the wireless phones and internet are provided by national communications companies Smart, Globe and Sun Cellular and a postal service is served by PHILPost.

Utilities
The Alabat Cable TV System operates and covers most of the town while Quezon I Electric Cooperative provides Electricity to Alabat and nearby-towns. Alabat Municipal Waterworks System provide the waterworks.

Healthcare
Alabat has a public hospital that is capable of providing most common medical services, as well as in handling medical emergencies. Alabat Island District Hospital, the institution which are considered to provide the same standard of healthcare and services, differing mainly with the medical and diagnostic facilities at hand.

These are staffed with qualified medical practitioners. The doctors are graduates of the many top reputable medical schools in the Philippines. Likewise, the nurses are the products of the many credible nursing schools in the country.

Education
Alabat has one tertiary school and numerous secondary and primary schools, including public and private.
The tertiary education system in Alabat provides instruction and training in fields of study, both for baccalaureate degrees and vocational courses. Southern Luzon State University- Alabat Campus - the only university in the island offers degree programs including education, information technology and fisheries.

Aside from tertiary school, the town also has an expanse footprint on the pre-school, primary and secondary levels of education, both in private and public schools. There are numerous day-care centers found all over the town.

Alabat Island National High School (Formerly Alabat Municipal High School)
Alabat Central Elementary School 
Angeles-Caglate Elementary School
Pambilan Elementary School
R.T. Camacho Elementary School
C.B. Encarnado Elementary School
Mater Carmelli Catholic School (Parochial School)

The Island Concept Dancers found in 2016, plays an important role on shaping the dance and performing arts scene of the municipality.

Sister cities
Makati City
Valenzuela City

Notable personalities

Kat Galang - an actress known as "Tassel Girl". She is no stranger to the limelight, having appeared in short films, commercials, TV series and theater plays. Her first big break is her portrayal on Kadenang Ginto.
Gionna Cabrera - was crowned Binibining Pilipinas - Universe 2005 who competed for the Miss Universe pageant in Thailand during the same year, representing the Philippines. She was awarded as Ms. Photogenic. Gionna is daughter of former Alabat Vice Mayor Nida J. Cabrera.

References

External links
Alabat Profile at PhilAtlas.com
Alabat municipality official page
[ Philippine Standard Geographic Code]
Philippine Census Information
Local Governance Performance Management System
Alabat Island Tambayan Page

Municipalities of Quezon